Sir Gabriel Stokes  (7 July 184922 October 1920) was an Irish civil servant and colonial administrator of the Indian Civil Service. He acted as the Governor of Madras between February–March 1906.

Family 

Gabriel Stokes was born on 7July 1849 at Ballyard, Tralee, County Kerry, Ireland and was educated at Kilkenny College, Armagh and Trinity College, Dublin.  The son of Henry Stokes, the county surveyor of Kerry, Stokes was born into a prominent family of academics which had been associated for Trinity College, Dublin for several generations.  His grandfather was Whitley Stokes, a Regius Professor of Physic at Trinity College,  Dublin, his great-grandfather Gabriel Stokes (1732-1806), a Professor of Mathematics at Trinity and his great-great-grandfather, also Gabriel Stokes, a Deputy Surveyor General of Ireland.  His older brother Henry Stokes was also a prominent member of the Indian civil service.  His great grand-uncle was the mathematician John Stokes.

Indian civil service 

Stokes cleared the Indian civil service examinations and qualified for the civil service in 1871. In India, he served as a member of the executive council of the Governor of Madras from 1896 to 1906 and from 1906 to 1907.

Governor of Madras 

Gabriel Stokes acted as the Governor of Madras from 15February 1906 to 28March 1906. During his tenure, the Asian Petroleum Company began its work in Madras.

Death
He died at his home, 72 Morehampton Road in Dublin, on 22October 1920.

Honours 
He was appointed a Companion of the Order of the Star of India (CSI) in the 1903 Durbar Honours, and in the 1909 New Year Honours, Stokes was made a Knight Commander of the same order (KCSI) for his services to the Crown.

References 

 

1849 births
1920 deaths
People educated at Kilkenny College
Knights Commander of the Order of the Star of India
Members of the Madras Legislative Council
Governors of Madras